is a Japanese football player.

Club statistics
Updated to 23 February 2016.

References

External links

Profile at Fujieda MYFC

1992 births
Living people
Biwako Seikei Sport College alumni
Association football people from Osaka Prefecture
J3 League players
Fujieda MYFC players
Association football midfielders
Japanese footballers